D4DJ (Dig Delight Direct Drive DJ) is a Japanese music media franchise created by Bushiroad, with original story by Kō Nakamura. Takaaki Kidani is credited as executive producer. It consists primarily of live disc jockey performances, a rhythm game for smartphones titled D4DJ Groovy Mix and a 13-episode anime television series titled D4DJ First Mix, which aired from October 2020 to January 2021. A spin-off anime series titled D4DJ Petit Mix aired from February to July 2021.  A standalone episode titled D4DJ Double Mix premiered in August 2022. A second season titled D4DJ All Mix premiered in January 2023.

Plot
Upon returning to Japan, first-year high school student Rinku Aimoto enrolls at Yoba Girls' Academy and meets Maho Akashi, the school's broadcaster and DJ. Rinku soon develops an interest in DJing after watching a performance by Yoba's famous DJ unit "Peaky P-key", and she and Maho form a group of their own called "Happy Around!". They are later joined by Muni Ohnaruto, a talented illustrator, and Rei Togetsu, a pianist.

Characters

Happy Around!
The latest idol-themed DJ unit from Yoba Academy. The name comes from Rinku's catchphrase, which she habitually says whenever she is joyfully spinning around. Their primary music genre style is a combination of J-pop and dubstep. They also use happy hardcore and gabbar.

 
 
 Having lived in Africa since her childhood due to her parents' work, Rinku finally returned to Japan prior to high school and currently lives with her grandparents. On her first day of school, Maho introduced her to DJ activities by inviting her to a performance by Peaky P-key. She was then inspired to create her own DJ unit alongside Maho. An optimist who is sometimes seen as an oddball, she can sense how certain musical pieces can connect by moving her body, so she serves as Happy Around!'s lead singer and dancer. On the other side, she deeply values her friendship with Muni, to the point she even cries when her relationship with Muni strained. Her name is a play on the word "link".
 
 
 A school DJ broadcaster under the name "Mash". Maho started her DJ activity after watching an outdoor concert when she was little. She initially attempted to reject Rinku's DJ unit invitation until she realized how serious Rinku is about it.
 
 
 An illustrator and VJ under the name "VJ Only", Muni has been attracting attention on the internet thanks to her drawings. She takes her art seriously, though she does not accept criticism kindly. She is Rinku's childhood friend, and reluctantly decides to join her unit upon being invited, but almost pulls out from her maiden appearance due to stage fright. Muni wears a rabbit ear headband and carries a cat plush called Nyochio during performances and in school.
 
 
 Being born to a wealthy family, Rei had lessons in all sorts of activities and is gifted at the piano. However, her parents set strict expectations that she wishes to be freed from. She serves as the group's composer and arranger. It is implied that in the past, she also attended a similar outdoor DJ concert like Maho, though the two did not know each other at the time.

Peaky P-key
A popular hip hop-themed DJ unit in Yoba Academy. It was formed during their middle school years. Also known as Peaky, their music style is a combination of techno, hip hop, and electro-pop.

 
 
 The charismatic leader of Peaky P-key. Born in a musical family, she has a natural talent for music. She later develops an admiration for Happy Around! after she watched their first show.
 
 
 A DJ who is the brains of Peaky P-key. She and Kyoko have known each other since childhood, though Shinobu constantly rejects Kyoko's requests to form a unit until middle school; since then, they have maintained a close bond together. Besides being a skilled DJ, she also excels in remixing and track-making. Outside her DJ activity, she enjoys online gaming.
 
 
 Yuka is the moodmaker of Peaky P-key. She met Kyoko as she was searching for the "greatest moment" to capture with her camera and decided to join the unit as a VJ. Raised by parents, who work as gym trainers, she is very cheerful and kind to everyone, and loves cheering up her fellow group members whom she regards as her best friends.
 
 
 The self-proclaimed "lovely" member of Peaky P-key. As a natural-born entertainer, she joined the unit to bring entertainment to everyone, and is even willing to expend her own fortune to achieve this goal. She is skilled at getting people to let their guards down and speak their minds. Esora is also a childhood friend of Lyrical Lily member Kurumi.

Photon Maiden
A sci-fi-themed DJ unit working under an entertainment agency and consisting of students at Yoba. Their music style is a combination of trance, techno, and dance music.

 
 
 Saki is a talented girl who excels in both study and sports. Having "synesthesia", she can see color in music. Despite her outstanding skills, Saki's personality is like a doll, rarely showing emotion unless she is on the stage.
 
 
 An athletic leader of Photon Maiden, Ibuki has participated in many sports since childhood. In junior high, she became hooked on the joy of dancing and singing and started to attend a show production school.
 
 
 Towa actively attends the local festivals due to her family's participation in the local youth organization. As a huge idol enthusiast, she still goes to idol concerts and tries to learn from their performances. She loves sweet foods but is often scolded by Ibuki for wanting to eat high-calorie foods before performances.
 
 
 Noa became interested in theater thanks to her love of literature, and decided to become a performer when she was praised at a theater workshop. Very curious and full of knowledge, she becomes talkative when it comes to things she is interested in. She also kidnapped Lyrical Lily in an episode of Petit Mix, and also has an unhealthy obsession with Muni.

Merm4id

A glamorous tropical-themed DJ unit form by first-year students at Seiho University who aspire to become famous like Photon Maiden. Their music genre consists of EDM, Electro House, and Progressive Trance.

 
 
 Holding "Life is to enjoy!" as her motto, Rika leads a positive university life. She loves to dance and sing with her friends at parties. She started her DJ activities with her best friend Marika along with Saori and Dalia whom she met by chance.
 
 
 Marika is an easygoing girl with a comforting atmosphere. Besides being a university student, she also works as a model. She was the center of attention upon entering university, but she became friends with Rika, who was able to talk to her despite all the attention.
 
 
 Saori started her DJ career in high school, and due to her hard-working nature, she has built up a certain level of technique. Her pessimistic thinking held her back from DJing actively, even as a university student. Rika forced her to join the unit, but has made up her mind to change her mentality and achieve her goals.
 
 
 Dalia devotes herself to practicing ballet, traditional Japanese dance, contemporary dance, and any other dance form in order to become a genre-exceeding dancer. She also acts as the bodyguard of the unit.

RONDO
A gothic rock-themed group consisting of first-year Seiho University students who work at a famous club called "ALTER-EGO". Their music style is mainly a combination of trance and rock with touch of drum and bass.

 
 
 A born vocalist who has been humming melodies for as long as she can remember. Tsubaki was asked to join the DJ unit, which was lacking a vocalist, by Aoi, and quickly attracted attention as soon as she joined. Despite the lack of any comments about her sexuality, it is implied to varying degrees depending on the media that she developed crush on Aoi due to her handsome looks and prince-ish personality.
 
 
 Nagisa is Shinobu's cousin who grew up in a rock music-loving family. She came across the club where Aoi performed as a DJ when she was searching for a place to practice, and often visits Hiiro's house as well.
 
 
 The most mature Rondo's unit member. As a VJ, her knowledge in art allows her to build the unique worldview of the unit.
 
 
 Aoi is a DJ that performs exclusively for a members-only club with a long history. She took interest in Tsubaki's singing skill and asked her to form a DJ unit.

Lyrical Lily
A lolita-themed DJ unit from Arisugawa Academy, a prestigious all-girls Catholic school. Their music style is a combination of synth-pop, house, and classical music.

 
 
 Miyu is a kind-hearted high school student with good conduct. She started her DJ activities when she came across some analog equipment with her friends. She loves singing, and is well-versed in popular songs from the Showa era as well as nostalgic music due to her family's influence.
 
 
 Haruna is an earnest girl who belongs to her high school's disciplinary committee. Her softhearted nature always gets her involved in all sorts of trouble.
 
 
 Kurumi is Esora's childhood friend. A cheerful girl who loves fun things and is bored of attending a strict school for children of rich and prestigious families, Kurumi is always looking for ways to create some kind of mischief.
 
 
 Miiko is a cheerful girl who loves to play and she also loves her fellow members of Lyrical Lily. She can be friends with anyone. She has a dream about traveling all over the world and making friends in many different countries, demonstrated by her ability to understand English. However, she is also passionate to the pranks caused by Kurumi and often she helps Kurumi to prank the others, including Haruna.

Call of Artemis
A former high school DJ unit that disbanded prior to First Mix, due to creative differences.

 
 
 Airi is a waitress working at the Cafe Vinyl. Eight years prior to the start of the series, she was part of a DJ unit group consisting of herself and three other members. When the four split, she later joined Mana to form Scarlet Canary.
 
 
 Mana is a former member of a DJ unit consisting of herself and three other members.
 
 
 Shano is a former member of a DJ group consisting of herself and three other members. She is now working as a music producer and is the person who founded Photon Maiden.
 
 
 Tōka is a former member of a DJ group consisting of herself and three others. She later joins Shano to form Lynx Eyes.

UniChØrd
A pop-house DJ unit formed by Michiru Kaibara at the request of Lumina Ichihoshi. Their cosmic aesthetic is relatively close to Photon Maiden's, however, with a lighter and more cheerful style. Although queer or vaguely queer characters have been in the franchise before, this is the first unit to not only include openly sapphic members, but who also in a openly lesbian relationships.

 
 
 Michiru is an independent DJ player and the childhood friend of Shinobu prior to Shinobu's involvement in Peaky. She aims to best Shinobu and tends to have weird and overreacting expressions. Michiru is later invited to form a unit consisting of herself and three other girls, being the DJ for that unit.
 
 
 A popular virtual singer who invites Michiru, Kokoa, and Hayate to form a DJ unit with her. She later reveals herself to be an AI.
 
 
 A sharp-tongued first-year student at Arisugawa Academy who is invited to form a DJ unit consisting of herself and three other girls, in spite of her grudge against Michiru. She is in a romantic relationship with Hayate.
 
 
 A poetic, yet air-headed first-year student at Arisugawa Academy who is invited to form a DJ unit consisting of herself and three other girls. She is in a romantic relationship with Kokoa.

Abyssmare
A gothic-themed American DJ unit backed by Sho Mitsuhashi that will go up against the DJ units of Japan.

 
 
 The cool-headed leader and vocalist of Abyssmare. She aims to become the world's greatest vocalist.
 
 
 The mood-reader and DJ of Abyssmare. She has low self-esteem due to her poor upbringing, but comes to worship Neo after her voice saved Sophia's life.
 
 
 The dancer and chorus, as well as the self-procalimed "number 2" of Abyssmare. An intellegent woman despite her cute looks who has studied ballet since she was young. She often gets into arguments with Weronika.
 
 
 The dancer and subvocal for Abyssmare. She is short-tempered but has a compassionate side to her, especially towards children. She has strong rivalry with Neo and often gets into arguments with Elsie.

Other characters
 
 
 Ryujin is the bartender and owner of Cafe Vinyl. Eight years prior to the start of the series, he was part of the DJ group LM.O., consisting of himself and four other members, including Shinobu's grandfather.
 
 
 Dennoji is a former DJ and former member of the DJ group LM.O. consisting of himself and four other members. He is also Shinobu's grandfather and served as a big inspiration for her.
 
 
 Ku is the son of Sho Mitsuhashi, a former member of the DJ group LM.O, as well as the first host of the revived D4 FES.
 
 
 Haruki is a DJ and former member of the DJ group LM.O. consisting of himself and four other members. He is also Michiru's uncle.

Media

Anime
An anime television series titled D4DJ First Mix was first announced in 2019. The series was animated by Sanzigen and directed by Seiji Mizushima. While the first episode had an early debut on October 22, 2020, the series officially aired from October 30, 2020 to January 29, 2021 on Tokyo MX, BS NTV, and other channels.
 
Bushiroad announced worldwide streaming, including in North America, Funimation, Crunchyroll, and Sentai Filmworks, the latter also releasing the series on Blu-ray in the future, plus HIDIVE streaming on more parts of the world. Medialink has also licensed the series and streamed it on its Ani-One YouTube channel in South Asia and Southeast Asia. Aniplus Asia simulcasted the series in Southeast Asia.

An English dub produced by Bang Zoom! Entertainment began streaming on January 16, 2021.

D4DJ Petit Mix, a spin-off chibi anime short series, aired from February 5 to July 30, 2021. Seiya Miyajima directed and oversaw the series' scripts at DMM.futureworks and W-Toon Studio. The series' theme is "Petit Mix Party Night!" by Happy Around!.

On March 13, 2022, a special episode titled D4DJ Double Mix was announced. Seiji Mizushima served as chief director, while Daisuke Suzuki served as director. It premiered on August 19, 2022.

On April 8, 2022, a second season titled D4DJ All Mix was announced. It features six music groups including Lyrical Lily. The staff reprised their roles with Daisuke Suzuki directing and Seiji Mizushima returning as chief director. It premiered on January 13, 2023. Lyrical Lily performed the opening theme "Maihime", while various cast members performed the ending theme "Around and Around".

Episode list

D4DJ First Mix

D4DJ Petit Mix

D4DJ All Mix

Manga
A manga adaptation titled D4DJ: The story of Happy Around! was launched in Bushiroad's Monthly Bushiroad magazine on October 8, 2020.

Volume list

D4DJ: The story of Happy Around!

D4DJ -The Starting of Photon Maiden-

Mobile game
D4DJ Groovy Mix is a free-to-play mobile rhythm game developed by Donuts and published by Bushiroad for the Android and iOS platforms. A demo version of the game, titled D4DJ Groovy Mix D4U Edition, was released on February 20, 2020. The full version of the game was released in Japan on October 25, 2020. An English version was released on May 27, 2021.

Explanatory notes

References

External links
  
  
 

2020 anime television series debuts
2021 anime television series debuts
2023 anime television series debuts
Android (operating system) games
Bushiroad
Crunchyroll anime
Free-to-play video games
Funimation
Gacha games
IOS games
Japanese idols in anime and manga
LGBT-related video games
Mass media franchises
Medialink
Music in anime and manga
Sanzigen
School life in anime and manga
Sentai Filmworks
Shōnen manga
Tokyo MX original programming
Video games about artificial intelligence
Video games developed in Japan